Aqua Unit Patrol Squad 1 (or AUPS1) is the alternative title given to the eighth season of the animated television series, Aqua Teen Hunger Force. Season eight originally aired in the United States on Cartoon Network's late night programming block, Adult Swim. Season eight premiered with the two-part episode "Allen" on May 8, 2011, and May 15, 2011, respectively; and ended with "Last Dance for Napkin Lad" on July 24, 2011, with a total of ten episodes. The show is about the surreal adventures and antics of three anthropomorphic fast food items: Master Shake, Frylock, and Meatwad, who live together as roommates and frequently interact with their human next-door neighbor, Carl Brutananadilewski in a suburban neighborhood in Seattle, Washington, which is completely identical to their former New Jersey home seen in past seasons. In May 2015, this season became available on Hulu Plus, and in May 2020, it became available on HBO Max.

Season eight is the first season in which the alternative titles for each season gag was set into place, starting with Aqua Unit Patrol Squad 1. Episodes in season eight were written and directed by Dave Willis and Matt Maiellaro. Almost every episode in this season features a special guest appearance, which continues a practice used in past seasons. Dave Willis and Matt Maiellaro received Annie Award nominations for writing in the season eight episode, "The Creditor". This season has been made available on DVD, and other forms of home media, including on demand streaming.

Production
Series creators Dave Willis and Matt Maiellaro wrote and directed every episode in this season, as they have for every previous season. All episodes originally aired in the United States on Cartoon Network's late night programming block, Adult Swim. As with most seasons, several episodes originally aired outside of their production order.

Despite being the eighth season of Aqua Teen Hunger Force, the show itself was renamed Aqua Unit Patrol Squad 1. Along with the new name, the season featured a new theme song by Josh Homme and Alain Johannes as well as a new opening sequence. Co-creator Matt Maiellaro announced that for the 2012 season, the show's title would be changed again to Aqua Something You Know Whatever and that the producer's intention was to change the title every year.

The song "Big Foot" from the Chickenfoot album Chickenfoot III was featured in the season eight episode "Last Dance For Napkin Lad". The episode aired July 24, 2011 prior the official release of the song on August 2, 2011. Chickenfoot had previously voiced themselves in the season seven episode "IAMAPOD".

Cast

In season eight the main cast consisted of Dana Snyder who provided the voice of Master Shake, Carey Means who provided the voice of Frylock, and series co-creator Dave Willis who provided the voice of both Meatwad and Carl Brutananadilewski; and recurring character Ignignokt, and George Lowe who introduced each episode, and voiced himself as various characters.

Season eight also featured appearances from recurring voice cast members such as C. Martin Croker who voiced both Dr. Weird and Steve in "Allen Part One", and Matt Maiellaro who voiced Err and Markula. Season eight also features several guest appearances. In "Allen" Matt Berry voiced Allen, Steven Wright voiced Danny, Michael K. Williams and Donnie Blue both voiced unnamed men, Idris Elba voiced the police officer in "Intervention", Tom Hollander voiced Chuck in "Vampirus", and both Duncan Trussell and Gregg Turkington voiced Wi-tris in "Wi-tri". Voice actor Zach Hanks provided the voice of Lance, the "Sham Wow!" host in "Lasagna". The Onion writer Todd Hanson, who previously voiced the www.yzzerdd.com on the series guest starred as Napkin Lad in "Last Dance for Napkin Lad".

Episodes

Reception
In 2011 Dave Willis and Matt Maiellaro received Annie Award nominations for writing in the season eight episode, "The Creditor", in the category of Writing in a Television Production during the 39th Annie Awards, held on February 4, 2012. Willis and Maiellaro lost the award to Carolyn Omine for witting The Simpsons season twenty three episode "Treehouse of Horror XXII".

Home release

The entire eighth season was released on the Aqua Unit Patrol Squad 1: Season 1 DVD set in Region 1 on October 11, 2011, along with seven episodes from the seventh season. The set was released by Adult Swim and distributed by Warner Home Video, and features uncensored dialogue and the special feature "Terror Phone 3". The set was later released in Region 4 by Madman Entertainment on November 30, 2011.

This season was also released under the label Aqua Unit Patrol Squad 1: Season 1 in HD and SD on iTunes, the Xbox Live Marketplace, and Amazon Video.

See also
 Alternative titles for Aqua Teen Hunger Force
 "Allen"
 List of Aqua Teen Hunger Force episodes
 Aqua Teen Hunger Force

References

External links

 Aqua Teen Hunger Force at Adult Swim
Aqua Teen Hunger Force season 8 at the Internet Movie Database

2011 American television seasons
Aqua Teen Hunger Force seasons
Seattle in fiction